Michael Thompson (born February 11, 1977) is a former American football offensive tackle who played in the National Football League. Thompson was drafted in the fourth round of the 2000 NFL Draft by the Atlanta Falcons. Thompson played for the Falcons until being released in 2002. In his career with the Falcons, Thompson played in 4 games, starting just two of them. He played college football at Tennessee State University.

Criminal activity
On August 31, 2005, the Atlanta Journal-Constitution reported that Thompson had been arrested. He was charged with 3 counts of armed robbery in Suwannee, Georgia. Thompson robbed three guests of the Admiral Benbow Inn at gunpoint.

References

1977 births
Living people
Atlanta Falcons players
Players of American football from Savannah, Georgia
Tennessee State Tigers football players